Finding Hillywood is a 2013 documentary film which examines the budding film industry in Rwanda (now popularly known as Hillywood).

Synopsis 
The film introduces viewers to the very beginning of Rwanda’s film industry, key members of Hillywood like Ayuub Kasasa Mago, and Eric Kabera. alongside its impact on Rwandans.

Awards 

 Best Documentary, Rainier Independent Film Fest (2014)
 Audience Award, Napa Film Festival (2013)
 Critic’s Award at Sebastopol Documentary Festival
 Best Pacific Northwest Film, Eugene International Film Fest (2013)
 Best Mid-Length Doc, Montreal Black Film Fest (2013)
 3rd Prize, Afghanistan Human Rights Festival (2013)

Festivals 

 2013: Seattle International Film Festival
 2013: Bahamas International Film Festival
 2014: FilmAid Film Festival

References 

2013 documentary films
Rwandan documentary films